Jason Harris may refer to:

 Jason Harris (marketer) (born 1971), president and CEO of the creative agency Mekanism
Jason Harris (footballer, born 1969), English association football player for Burnley
Jason Harris (footballer, born 1976), English association football player who played in the Football League for a number of clubs
Jason Harris Katz, American television personality and voice actor
Jason James Harris, known as Moose Harris, British bassist
Jason Harris, a retired wrestler with Extreme Championship Wrestling

See also
Jay Harris (disambiguation)